The Barstable School, also known as The Federation of Chalvedon School and Sixth Form College and Barstable Schools and The East Basildon School, was a mixed intake secondary school in Basildon, Essex.

Admissions
The school was for students aged 11–16 (school years 7–11). The schools headmaster was Alan Roach, who incidentally, was also head of Chalvedon School and Sixth Form College. Barstable recently received a vastly improved Ofsted inspection, bringing the school up to standard requirements. The school has received the Sportsmark designation and is part of Creative Partnerships.

The school was situated on the south side of the A1321, west of the A132 roundabout, around one mile directly east of Basildon town centre. The part of Basildon known as Barstable is named after the former Barstable Hall.

History

Grammar school
The Barstable School building first opened on 1 March 1962 as the Barstable Grammar and Technical School, a grammar technical school. The grammar school was designed by the Finnish architect Cyril Leonard Sjöström Mardall (of YRM Architects, Yorke, Rosenberg and Mardall).
The school started before the building existed. Students were housed temporarily in Woodlands Boys School from September 1958 and in Woodlands Girls School in September 1959. The boys and girls were joined as mixed classes after the February half term in 1962.

Comprehensive
In 1968, the Grammar and Technical School under the Headmaster G G Whitehead merged with the Timberlog Secondary Modern School. When the two schools merged into one school, it took the name of Barstable School. Timberlog Secondary School became a housing estate in the 1990s, following a time as the site of the Lower School.

On 2 November 1973, many children from the school were injured when involved in a coach collision with a lorry in Orpington, when on a school holiday.

On 30 March 1993 the building became a Grade II listed building. Around this time, the school was grant-maintained.

On 16 September 2003, a 14-year-old boy was taken ill in a PE lesson, and later died in Basildon General Hospital. Tests showed the cause to be an unidentified heart defect.

In 2006, David Cameron visited the school. The school suffered from very low, and unacceptable, exam results.

When it closed, over 20% of its pupils were receiving free school meals. Its successful future as a school was not even helped by the fact that from 2008–9 it was receiving £5,137 per pupil, one of the highest in Essex, which had an average of £4,066 per pupil.

Academy
In September 2009 it became The Basildon Lower Academy, for ages 11–14. Chalvedon School became The Basildon Upper Academy. On development of the Academy, pupil numbers changed from around 400 to around 950.

Blocks
Barstable School had five blocks - A Block, B Block, L Block, S Block and T Block. The building was listed in 1993 and is Grade II listed.

A Block
This block housed the Art department, Performing Arts, Citizenship and Religious Studies, the Science department, History and Geography. This building contained three floors, and also contained an elevator to ensure ease of access.

B Block
This block housed Food Technology, the Maths department, the English department and Modern Foreign Languages. Also the Library. It was very similar in structure to "A Block", in that it had three floors, and also contained an elevator.

D Block
This block contained the Special Needs Department.

S Block
This block housed the Gym, Sports Hall and a Swimming Pool. It also housed Jake's Gym. Jake's Gym is a gym that has been created in partnership with Pulse. It contained an aerobics centre as well as a fully functioning gym.

T Block
This block housed the ICT department and the Technology department.

The Federation of Chalvedon and Barstable Schools
As of January 2006, the school became part of a federation with local school, Chalvedon School. They were both run by headmaster Alan Roach.

Academic performance
In the 1990s, around 20% were gaining five good GCSEs.

In 2005 when 10% of those taking GCSEs gained 5 good grades, including Maths and English, this was the 34th lowest result in England, and the lowest in Essex LEA (one in nearby Thurrock LEA was lower - former Essex). In 2003 it was 11th lowest in England.

Alumni

Barstable Grammar and Technical School
 Tony Parsons, arts journalist
 Stuart Bingham, professional snooker player
 Dave Gahan, singer with Depeche Mode
 Glenn Keeley, professional footballer
 Dave Favis-Mortlock, geomorphologist and jazz violinist
 Simon Swordy, former director of the Enrico Fermi Institute Chicago and Professor of Physics, Astronomy and Astrophysics, University of Chicago

References

External links
 Barstable's Website
 Listed building

Educational institutions established in 1962
Educational institutions disestablished in 2009
Grade II listed buildings in Essex
Borough of Basildon
Defunct schools in Essex
1962 establishments in England
2009 disestablishments in England